Darcey is a commune in the Côte-d'Or department in the Bourgogne-Franche-Comté region of eastern France.

Population

See also
Communes of the Côte-d'Or department

References

Further reading

Communes of Côte-d'Or